Vladimir Mikhailovich Grinin (born 15 November 1947) is a Russian former diplomat who served as the Russian ambassadors to Austria, Finland, Poland, and Germany.

Biography
Vladimir Mikhailovich Grinin was born on 15 November 1947 in Moscow, Soviet Union. Grinin graduated from the Moscow State Institute of International Relations in 1971 and commenced diplomatic work, serving at the Soviet Embassy in West Germany from 1973 to 1980. After his posting to West Germany, he returned to Moscow and attended the Diplomatic Academy of the Ministry of Foreign Affairs of the USSR. Grinin graduated in 1982 and participated in Soviet-American negotiations on disarmament and arms control in Geneva until 1986. He was then posted to the Soviet Embassy in East Germany from 1986 and then in Germany from 1990 to 1992.

From 1994 to 1996, Grinin was director of the Fourth European Department at the Russian Ministry of Foreign Affairs. He was appointed by President Boris Yeltsin as Ambassador of Russia to Austria in 1996, and held the post in Vienna until 2000. After this posting he returned to Moscow, and was appointed by President Vladimir Putin as Ambassador of Russia to Finland in 2003, and held this post until 2006, when he was appointed as Ambassador of Russia to Poland. Grinin served as Ambassador of Russia to Germany in Berlin from 2010 until reaching the age limit for Russian ambassadors and was replaced by Sergey Nechaev on 10 January 2018.

Grinin is married with one daughter, and speaks Russian, English, German and French.

References

1947 births
Living people
Soviet diplomats
Moscow State Institute of International Relations alumni
Diplomatic Academy of the Ministry of Foreign Affairs of the Russian Federation alumni
Ambassador Extraordinary and Plenipotentiary (Russian Federation)
Ambassadors of Russia to Austria
Ambassadors of Russia to Finland
Ambassadors of Russia to Poland
Ambassadors of Russia to Germany
Commanders Crosses of the Order of Merit of the Federal Republic of Germany